G. crispa may refer to:
 Gastrococos crispa, a palm species
 Gomesa crispa, an orchid species in the genus Gomesa
 Guarea crispa, a plant species endemic to Brazil

See also
 Crispa (disambiguation)